The Đại Việt–Khmer War were a series of wars and conflicts fought between the Kingdom of Đại Việt and the combined forces of Champa and the Khmer Empire between 1123 and 1150.

Background
At this time, Đại Việt was in a vulnerable position due to internal conflict and a series of wars with their neighbors. In 1127, the 12-years-old Crown Prince Lý Dương Hoán became the new ruler of Đại Việt. Suryavarman II demanded Đại Việt to pay tribute for the Khmer Empire, but the Vietnamese refused to pay tribute to the Khmers. Suryavarman II decided to expand his territory northward into Vietnamese territory.

The conflicts

The first attack was in 1128 when King Suryavarman II led 20,000 soldiers from Savannakhet to Nghệ An but were routed in battle. The following year Suryavarman continued skirmishes on land and sent 700 ships to bombard the coastal areas of Đại Việt. The warfare escalated in 1132 when Khmer Empire and Champa jointly invaded Đại Việt, briefly seizing Nghệ An. In 1136, Duke Đỗ Anh Vũ led an expedition with thirty thousand troops into Khmer territories, but his army later retreated after subdued highland tribes in Xiangkhoang. By 1136, King Jaya Indravarman III of Champa made peace with the Vietnamese, which led to the Khmer–Cham War. In 1138, Lý Thần Tông died aged 22 from a disease and was succeeded by his two years old son Lý Anh Tông. Suryavarman II led several more attacks on Đại Việt until his death in 1150.

Aftermath
After a failed attempt to seize seaports in southern Đại Việt, Suryavarman turned to invade Champa in 1145 and sacked Vijaya, ending the reign of Jaya Indravarman III and destroying the temples at Mỹ Sơn. Inscriptional evidence suggests that Suryavarman II died between 1145 AD and 1150 AD, possibly during a military campaign against Champa. He was succeeded by Dharanindravarman II, a cousin, son of the brother of the king's mother. A period of weak rule and feuding began.

The three provinces Dia Ly (Jriy), Bo Chinh (Traik), Malinh, which Champa had lost to the Dai Viet around 1069–1076, were probably returned to the Cham sphere of influence during 1131-1136, which was testified by both Chinese and Cham sources.

References

Sources
Coèdes, George (1968). Vella, Walter F. (ed.). The Indianized States of Southeast Asia. trans.Susan Brown Cowing.   University of Hawaii Press, .
 
 
Maspero, Georges (2002). The Champa Kingdom. White Lotus Co. Ltd. .
 

12th century in Cambodia
History of Vietnam
12th-century conflicts
Geopolitical rivalry
Military history of Cambodia
Wars involving Cambodia
Military history of Vietnam
Wars involving Vietnam